Astartoidea is a superfamily of bivalves in the order Carditida. In the World Register of Marine Species (WoRMS), it is considered a junior synonym of Crassatelloidea, whereas in ITIS Crassatelloidea is a separate superfamily containing Crassatellidae.

List of families 
According to ITIS:

 Astartidae
 Cardiniidae – classified in Carditoidea by WoRMS

References

External links 

Astartoidea at fossilworks

Mollusc superfamilies
Carditida